Yalchiksky District (Yelçĕk rayonĕ) is an administrative and municipal district (raion), one of the twenty-one in the Chuvash Republic, Russia. It is located in the southeast of the republic and borders with the Republic of Tatarstan in the north, south, and east, Komsomolsky District in the west, and with Batyrevsky District in the southwest. Its administrative center is the rural locality (a selo) of Yalchiki. Population:    35,200 (1979 Census). The population of Yalchiki accounts for 12.4% of the district's total population.

History
The district was established on September 5, 1927.

Demographics
97% of the population are Chuvash.

References

Notes

Sources

Districts of Chuvashia